The 1941 Fresno State Bulldogs football team represented Fresno State Normal School—now known as California State University, Fresno—during the 1941 college football season.

Fresno State competed in the California Collegiate Athletic Association (CCAA). The team was led by sixth-year head coach James Bradshaw and played home games at Ratcliffe Stadium on the campus of Fresno City College in Fresno, California. They finished the season as co-champions of the CCAA, with a record of four wins, three losses and two ties (4–3–2, 2–0–1 CCAA). The Bulldogs outscored their opponents 118–90 for the season, including shutting out their opponents four times.

Schedule

Team players in the NFL
No Fresno State Bulldog players were selected in the 1942 NFL Draft.

The following Fresno State Bulldog players finished their college career in 1941, were not drafted, but played in the NFL.

Notes

References

Fresno State
Fresno State Bulldogs football seasons
California Collegiate Athletic Association football champion seasons
Fresno State Bulldogs football